Elachista hololeuca is a moth of the family Elachistidae. It is found in British Columbia, Arizona, California, Colorado, Nevada, Oregon, Washington and Wyoming.

The basal 1/4 of the costa of the forewings is grey. The ground colour is white, sometimes with a creamy tinge, occasionally dusted with light grey scales. The hindwings are grey. The underside of the forewings is dark grey and the underside of the hindwings is lighter grey.

References

Moths described in 1948
Endemic fauna of the United States
Moths of North America
hololeuca